LOMA, (short for the Life Office Management Association) and  LIMRA (formerly Life Insurance Marketing and Research Association) under the umbrella organization LL Global is one of the largest trade associations in the U.S. insurance industry.

LOMA offers an employee training and development program used by the majority of American life insurance companies, and by life insurance companies in over 70 countries worldwide. The president and CEO of LL Global is David Levenson.

LOMA administers a series of designation programs. The Fellow, Life Management Institute (FLMI) designation program, awards the FLMI designation to individuals who pass a series of 10 examinations; these insurance-focused examinations cover insurance, accounting, marketing, information systems, finance, law, management, and computers. Brokers also use the LOMA educational courses to count towards the continuing education (CE) requirement needed to maintain their license in good standing with regulators.

LOMA's board of directors is made up of insurance industry chief executive officers, presidents and vice-presidents, lawyers and other industry professionals.

History 
The National Life Office Management Association "in the early nineteen thirties was one of the first management societies or trade associations to assign an increasingly prominent role to some kind of selective records preservation in the programs of their annual meetings and in the work projects of their research groups."

LOMA developed a series of merit rating scales for clerical employees based on traits and behavioral elements, published in 1950.

Designations and examinations 
, below are some of the designations offered by LOMA, as well as their associated courses/exams.

Customer service

References

External links 
LOMA website

Professional associations based in the United States
Organizations based in Georgia (U.S. state)
Life insurance